H2 producing hydrogenase may refer to:

 Ferredoxin hydrogenase, an enzyme
 Hydrogenase (acceptor), an enzyme